Bagillt railway station was a  railway station serving the village of Bagillt on the North Wales Coast Line  in the Welsh county of Flintshire. Although trains still pass on the main line, the station closed in 1966.

History
Opened by the Chester and Holyhead Railway,  then joining the London and North Western Railway, the station became part of the London Midland and Scottish Railway during the Grouping of 1923. The station then passed on to the London Midland Region of British Railways on nationalisation in 1948, and was closed by the British Railways Board as part of the Beeching Report economies of the 1960s.

The site today
Trains still pass on the double track North Wales Coast Line. The remains of the platforms are visible from passing trains, including the footbridge.

References

Sources

Further reading

External links 
Station on navigable O. S. map
 Sub Brit on Bagillt
Aerial View of site on Wikimapia

Former London and North Western Railway stations
Railway stations in Great Britain opened in 1849
Railway stations in Great Britain closed in 1966
Beeching closures in Wales
Disused railway stations in Flintshire